Wild Justice is an adventure novel by Wilbur Smith. It was partially set in Seychelles where Smith had a home for a number of years.

It was the third best selling book in England in 1980.

The novel was published in the US as The Delta Decision.

TV adaptation

The novel was filmed for TV in 1993 as a two-part miniseries.

It is also known as Covert Assassin.

Cast 
 Roy Scheider - Peter Stride
 Patricia Millardet - Magda Altman
 Christopher Buchholz - Colin Noble
 Ted McGinley - Aubrey Billings
 Clive Francis - Sir Steven
 Sam Wanamaker - Kingston Parker
 Kelly Marcel - Melissa Stride
 Richard Ridings - Carl
 Constantine Gregory - Sergei Bulov
 David Yip - Wong
 Kevork Malikyan - Ali Hassan
 Rita Wolf - Vritra

References

External links
Wild Justice at Pan MacMillan
Wild Justice (film) at IMDb
Review of mini-series at Variety
Review of mini-series at People magazine

Novels by Wilbur Smith
1979 British novels
Heinemann (publisher) books
Seychelles in fiction
1993 films
1990s English-language films